Prostantheroideae is a subfamily of plants in the family Lamiaceae.

Genera include:
 Brachysola
 Chloanthes
 Cyanostegia
 Dasymalla
 Dicrastylis
 Hemiandra
 Hemigenia
 Hemiphora
 Lachnostachys
 Microcorys
 Muniria
 Newcastelia
 Physopsis
 Pityrodia
 Prostanthera
 Quoya
 Westringia

References

Lamiaceae
Asterid subfamilies